Cerobasis harteni is a species of Psocoptera from the Trogiidae family that can be found in the Azores and North Africa.

References

Trogiidae
Insects described in 1984
Arthropods of the Azores
Insects of North Africa